Sheikh Abu Naser (1928-1975) was a Bangladeshi politician and the only brother of the first President of Bangladesh, Sheikh Mujibur Rahman. He was the uncle of the present Prime Minister of Bangladesh, Sheikh Hasina.

Early life
His elder brother was Sheikh Mujibur Rahman and he had 4 sisters.

Career
Naser had a prosperous clearing and forwarding agency in the erstwhile East Pakistan. He earned almost Rs. 40,000 per month and employed mostly Hindus. His business was destroyed by the Pakistan Army, rendering him penniless, and Naser fled to neighboring India with nothing except a lungi and a shirt. He left his wife and children back in Bangladesh, whose whereabouts he was unaware of. The former communications minister and Muslim League leader Abdus Sabur Khan attempted to bribe Naser in order to persuade him to convince his brother Sheikh Mujibur Rahman to accept the 4-point program of General Yahya Khan. Abdus Sabur Khan promised Naser that if he could convince his brother, then Naser would get many lucrative contracts in West Pakistan. Naser refused to accept the bribe and exclaimed that Mujib would rather die than sacrifice his principles. Naser was a member of Mukti Bahini during Bangladesh Liberation war and was formally recognized by the government of Bangladesh as a freedom fighter after the Independence of Bangladesh. In 1975, he was the largest contractor in Khulna.

Personal life
Naser was married to Begum Razia Naser Dolly. He had five sons and two daughters named Sheikh Jalaluddin Rubel, Sheikh Helal Uddin, Sheikh Jewel, and Sheikh Sohel, Sheikh Belal, Sheikh Tahmina and Sheikh Farhana Sheikh Sohel is a director of Bangladesh Cricket Board while Sheikh Helal and Sheikh Jewel are members of parliament. His grandson Sheikh Tonmoy (son of Sheikh Helal) is also a member of parliament. Naser's granddaughter Sheikh Shaira Rahman (daughter of Sheikh Helal) is married to his grand-nephew Andaleeve Rahman (grandson of his sister Sheikh Asia Begum). Naser was said to have closely resembled his brother Sheikh Mujibur Rahman.

Death and legacy
Naser was killed on 15 August 1975 by mutinous Bangladesh Army officers at the residence Sheikh Mujibur Rahman in Dhanmondi, during the course of the assassination of Sheikh Mujibur Rahman. He pleaded the assassins not to kill him as he was just a businessman and said to them, "I am not into politics, I do business for a living." Nevertheless, he was taken to a bathroom of the house where a soldier shot him. He was bleeding and begged for water when another soldier came in and shot him again, killing him. A number of Mujib's family members were killed by the assassins.

Sheikh Abu Naser Stadium in Khulna was named after him in 1996 by the Bangladesh Awami League government. In 2003 the Bangladesh Nationalist Party renamed the stadium Birshreshtha Shaheed Flight Lieutenant Matiur Rahman stadium. The stadium was renamed to Sheikh Abu Naser Stadium in 2009 after Bangladesh Awami League returned to power. Sheikh Abu Naser Specialised Hospital in Khulna is also named after him and was opened in 2010.

Criticism
Naser was accused of being a ringleader of syndicates smuggling jute to India during the Presidency of Sheikh Mujibur Rahman. It is said that his rise from near poverty in 1971 to being the largest contractor in Khulna was through favoritism and illegal means.

References

1st Jatiya Sangsad members
Awami League politicians
Bangladeshi people of Arab descent
Mukti Bahini personnel
Sheikh Mujibur Rahman family
1928 births
1975 deaths